Stranglehold is a 1931 British drama film directed by Henry Edwards and starring Isobel Elsom, Garry Marsh and Derrick De Marney. It was made by Warner Brothers at Teddington Studios as a quota quickie. It is now a lost film.

Cast
 Isobel Elsom as Beatrice 
 Garry Marsh as Bruce 
 Derrick De Marney as Phillip 
 Allan Jeayes as King 
 Dorothy Bartlam as Grace 
 Minnie Rayner as Cook 
 Henry Vibart as Farren 
 Hugh E. Wright as Briggs

References

Bibliography
 Chibnall, Steve. Quota Quickies: The Birth of the British 'B' Film. British Film Institute, 2007.

External links

1931 films
1931 drama films
Films directed by Henry Edwards
British drama films
Warner Bros. films
Films shot at Teddington Studios
Quota quickies
British black-and-white films
1930s English-language films
1930s British films